Norman Stuart Craig  (born 14 April 1942) is a noted British production designer. He has also designed the sets, together with his frequent collaborator set decorator, the late Stephenie McMillan, on all of the Harry Potter films to date.

Life and career
At Potter author J. K. Rowling's request, he worked with Universal Creative team to design the Wizarding World of Harry Potter at Universal's Islands of Adventure theme park. Rowling said in a December 2007 interview on the Potter podcast PotterCast, "The key thing for me was that, if there was to be a theme park, that Stuart Craig … would be involved. … More than involved, that he would pretty much design it. Because I love the look of the films; they really mirror what’s been in my imagination for all these years".

He has been nominated for eleven Academy Awards, and has won three: in 1982 for Gandhi, in 1988 for Dangerous Liaisons, and in 1996 for The English Patient. He has been nominated for a BAFTA award sixteen times, including for the first six and last Potter films, and has won three times: in 1980 for The Elephant Man, in 2005 for Harry Potter and the Goblet of Fire, and in 2016 for Fantastic Beasts and Where to Find Them.

Stuart Craig has been nominated for a BAFTA Award for six films in a row, namely the first six Harry Potter films.

For his work on The English Patient, Harry Potter and the Philosopher's Stone, Harry Potter and Order of the Phoenix, Harry Potter and the Half-Blood Prince, and Harry Potter and the Deathly Hallows – Part 1 and Part 2, Craig was nominated for an Art Directors Guild award and won the same for The English Patient and Harry Potter and the Deathly Hallows – Part 2. The Guild has also honored Craig with a Lifetime Achievement Award at the awards ceremony on 16 February 2008.

Filmography
As art director
 A Bridge Too Far (1977)
 Superman (1978)

As production designer

Awards and nominations 
Academy Awards

British Academy Film Awards

References

External links

1942 births
Living people
Best Art Direction Academy Award winners
Best Production Design BAFTA Award winners
British film designers
Officers of the Order of the British Empire
Alumni of Norwich University of the Arts